Gymnastics at the 2010 Asian Games was held at the Asian Games Town Gymnasium in Guangzhou, China from November 13 to 26, 2010.

Schedule

Medalists

Men's artistic

Women's artistic

Rhythmic

Trampoline

Medal table

Participating nations
A total of 172 athletes from 24 nations competed in gymnastics at the 2010 Asian Games:

References

 Men's artistic - Qualification
 Women's artistic - Qualification
 Men's artistic - Individual all-around
 Women's artistic - Individual all-around
 Artistic - Apparatus finals
 Rhythmic results

External links
Gymnastics Site of 2010 Asian Games

 
2010
2010 Asian Games events
Asian Games
International gymnastics competitions hosted by China